Tim Siersleben (born 9 March 2000) is a German footballer who plays as a centre-back for 2. Bundesliga club 1. FC Heidenheim, on loan from VfL Wolfsburg.

Career
Siersleben made his professional debut for VfL Wolfsburg in the Bundesliga on 22 May 2021, coming on as a substitute in the 57th minute for John Brooks against Mainz 05.

On 1 July 2021, Siersleben joined 1. FC Heidenheim on a two-year loan.

Personal life
Siersleben is the son of former footballer and manager Frank Siersleben.

References

External links
 
 
 
 

2000 births
Living people
Sportspeople from Magdeburg
Footballers from Saxony-Anhalt
German footballers
Germany youth international footballers
Association football central defenders
VfL Wolfsburg II players
VfL Wolfsburg players
1. FC Heidenheim players
Regionalliga players
Bundesliga players